The statue of Alan Brooke, 1st Viscount Alanbrooke by Ivor Roberts-Jones was unveiled in Whitehall, London in 1993.

References

External links
 
 Plaque: Alanbrooke statue at London Remembers
 The Field Marshall Viscount Alanbrooke at Waymarking

1993 establishments in England
1993 sculptures
Monuments and memorials in London
Outdoor sculptures in London
Alanbrooke
Alanbrooke
Whitehall